The western yellow wagtail (Motacilla flava) is a small passerine in the wagtail family Motacillidae, which also includes the pipits and longclaws.

This species breeds in much of temperate Europe and Asia. It is resident in the milder parts of its range, such as western Europe, but northern and eastern populations migrate to Africa and south Asia.

It is a slender 15–16 cm long bird, with the characteristic long, constantly wagging tail of its genus. It is the shortest tailed of the European wagtails. The breeding adult male is basically olive above and yellow below. In other plumages, the yellow may be diluted by white. The heads of breeding males come in a variety of colours and patterns depending on subspecies.

The call is a high-pitched jeet.

This insectivorous bird inhabits open country near water, such as wet meadows. It nests in tussocks, laying 4–8 speckled eggs.

Systematics 

Motacilla is the Latin name for the wagtail; although actually a diminutive of motare, " to move about", from medieval times it led to the misunderstanding of cilla as "tail". The specific flava is Latin for golden-yellow.

This species' systematics and phylogeny is extremely confusing. Dozens of subspecies have been described at one time or another, and some 15-20 are currently considered valid depending on which author reviews them. In addition, the citrine wagtail (M. citreola) forms a cryptic species complex with this bird; both taxa as conventionally delimited are paraphyletic in respect to each other. The populations of the Beringian region are sometimes separated as eastern yellow wagtail (M. tschutschensis).

Currently recognized subspecies

Colouration refers to males except when noted.

M. f. flava Linnaeus, 1758 – blue-headed wagtail
 Blue-grey head with white supercilium and malar stripe in males, much washed with buffish green in females.
 Breeding: southern Scandinavia to France and central European mountain ranges, east to Urals. Winter: sub-Saharan Africa.
M. f. flavissima Blyth, 1834 – yellow-crowned wagtail
 Yellow-green head with a brighter yellow supercilium. Females markedly paler below than males.
 Breeding: Britain and English Channel coast. Winter: Africa.
M. f. thunbergi Billberg, 1828 – dark-headed wagtail or grey-headed wagtail
Head dark grey, reaching down to the cheeks, and without white in males; lighter and washed greenish, with vestigial greenish supercilium in females.
Breeding: central and northern Scandinavia east to north-west Siberia. Winter: eastern Africa, Indian subcontinent, Southeast Asia.
M. f. iberiae Hartert, 1921 – Iberian yellow wagtail
Like flava, but throat white and grey darker, almost black behind eyes.
Breeding: south-eastern France, Iberia, Maghreb from Tunisia to Banc d'Arguin. Winter: The Gambia to the Central African Republic.
M. f. cinereocapilla Savi, 1831 – ashy-headed wagtail
Like iberiae but supercilium absent or vestigial.
Breeding: Sicily, Sardinia, Italy, Slovenia. Winter: coastal Tunisia and Algeria, Mali to Lake Chad.
M. f. pygmaea (A. E. Brehm, 1854) – Egyptian yellow wagtail
Similar to cinereocapilla, smaller, less bright.
Nile delta and lower Nile, resident all year.
M. f. feldegg Michahelles, 1830 – black-headed wagtail
Like thunbergi but black cap in males, females like a dull thunbergi male above, very washed-out dirty yellowish below, throat white.
Breeding: Balkans east to the Caspian Sea, south to Turkey, Iran and Afghanistan; also Levant. Winter: central Africa from Nigeria to Uganda and south Sudan.
M. f. lutea (S. G. Gmelin, 1774) – yellow-headed wagtail
Head yellow with green neck in males, females like a somewhat more vivid flava female.
Breeding: Lower Volga to Irtysh River and Lake Zaysan. Winter: Africa and Indian subcontinent.
M. f. beema (Sykes, 1832) – Sykes' wagtail
Like flava but head lighter grey, ears washed white; sexes often similar.
Breeding: North of lutea, east to Ladakh area. Winter: Indian subcontinent, also east Africa and adjacent Arabia.
M. f. melanogrisea (Homeyer, 1878) – Turkestan black-headed wagtail
Similar to feldegg, but white malar stripe and sometimes green neck.
Breeding: Volga Delta east around Caspian Sea to northern Afghanistan. Winter: Pakistan and north-west India to western Nepal, possibly also north-eastern Africa.
M. f. plexa (Thayer & Bangs, 1914) – north Siberian yellow wagtail
Males like thunbergi but ears darker, top of head lighter, vestigial supercilium. Females like dull males.
Breeding: Siberia between Khatanga and Kolyma Rivers. Winter: India, south-east Asia.
M. f. leucocephala (Przevalski, 1887) – white-headed yellow wagtail
Male like flava, but grey of head very pale, almost white. Female like flava females, but head somewhat darker.
Breeding: North-west Mongolia and adjacent China and Russia. Winter: probably India.

The nominate blue-headed wagtail and yellow wagtail form a narrow hybrid zone in northern France. Birds from this zone vary in appearance, but one type, which resembles nominate blue-headed wagtail (except that the blue tones to the head are paler and more mauve and the white of the head is more extensive, particularly on the throat, ear-coverts, and supercilium) is colloquially referred to as Channel wagtail.

In culture 
In the Pyramid Texts of Old Kingdom Egypt, the yellow wagtail was considered a representation of Atum himself and might have been the first inspiration for the Bennu bird, which, in turn, is the supposed inspiration for the phoenix of Greek mythology.

Gallery

References

Sources

External links 

Ageing and sexing (PDF; 4.2 MB) by Javier Blasco-Zumeta & Gerd-Michael Heinze
Oiseaux Images
 Western yellow wagtail – Species text in The Atlas of Southern African Birds.

western yellow wagtail
Birds of Eurasia
Birds described in 1758
Birds of East Africa
western yellow wagtail